BoBoiBoy: The Movie is a 2016 Malaysian computer-animated superhero comedy film directed by Nizam Razak, who also co-wrote the screenplay with Anas Abdul Aziz. It is Animonsta Studios' first feature film, based on their animated TV series BoBoiBoy. The film follows BoBoiBoy and his friends on an adventure on a mysterious island to find Ochobot, who is kidnapped by a group of alien treasure hunters so that they could locate an ancient Power Sphere that predates Ochobot.

BoBoiBoy: The Movie was released on 3 March 2016 in Malaysia, and 13 April 2016 in Indonesia. It received positive reviews and was a box office success in the region, having grossed around RM20 million. A sequel, BoBoiBoy Movie 2, was released on 8 August 2019.

Plot 

It is the day when BoBoiBoy is going camping with his friends. Ochobot, his power sphera friend who is also the ninth generation of Power Sphere, woke him up as it is already late. His friends, Yaya, Ying, and Gopal remind him again of the camp. As BoBoiBoy and Ochobot are on their way to the camp, BoBoiBoy spots a chase between the police and a group of robbers, which turns out to be a part of a robbery in progress. Instead of going to the camp, he decides to catch the robbers and leaves Ochobot alone.

BoBoiBoy eventually manages to help the police find the Serial Laundry Robbers. He goes to Tok Aba's Kokotiam forgetting his camping trip with his friends. When Tok Aba reminded him of the camp, he suddenly remembered it and immediately went to the bus stop where his friends were waiting at. Meanwhile, Bora Ra, the leader of Tengkotak group, overhears Yoyo Oo giving the explanation that Klamkabot, the first generation of Power Sphere which they tried to catch earlier, teleported to Earth, but fails to get the exact location of it.  Bora Ra becomes angry and threatens to either search for it or get out from his spaceship.  Yoyo Oo nervously searches for it, but he finds another Power Sphere with a lower frequency than Klamkabot. Yoyo Oo lies to his leader that he had found Klamkabot's location.

At the bus stop, BoBoiBoy arrives in front of his friends, who were angry especially Ochobot. He apologises but his friends refuse to accept it, much to BoBoiBoy's dismay. He meets Papa Zola, who motivates him to persuade his friends to go squid fishing. BoBoiBoy later agrees to follow Papa Zola fish squids the next day. The following day, he tells his friends about squid fishing, but they think it is a bad idea. Suddenly, the Tengkotak Gang make their entrance and demand BoBoiBoy to give the Power Sphere. Bora Ra takes Ochobot, and that makes BoBoiBoy fight Bora Ra and Gaga Naz. Gaga Naz manages to defeat BoBoiBoy but fails to defeat Yaya, Ying, and Gopal.  Ochobot gets taken by the Tengkotak Gang, yet Adu Du and Probe manage to enter the Tengokotak spaceship. Back at the town, Fang comes late to Tok Aba's Kokotiam.

Papa Zola takes a selfie alone at the jetty. He gets startled by the arrival of BoBoiBoy and his friends. They ask for help to find Ochobot.  They find a clue about the floating island's location, which is near the lighthouse.  They take a boat ride towards the lighthouse's location.  Meanwhile, in the Tengkotak spaceship, Adu Du finds Kiki Ta and falls in love with her. Probe asked Bora Ra whether they are afraid of BoBoiBoy coming back to help Ochobot. Bora Ra felt strange when he hears that BoBoiBoy and Ochobot were friends. Probe answers with saying that he and Adu Du were friends. The other Tengkotak members erupt with laughter, much to Adu Du's fury. Adu Du and Bora Ra end up in a heated squabble. However, they are interrupted by the information that BoBoiBoy is near. Bora Ra gives Adu Du the Kurita, a small squid that enlarges when exposed to water. Adu Du and Probe with the Kurita later get ejected into the sea.

Meanwhile, Papa Zola realises that Adu Du is coming closer. BoBoiBoy orders Ying to speed up the boat using her power. They eventually encounter Adu Du and Probe and questions him of Ochobot's whereabouts. Kurita, exposed to the seawater, grows to gigantic size and attack the boat and Adu Du.  They try to beat Kurita but failed. The boat speeds up to run away from Kurita, with Adu Du and Probe hooked on it. They eventually land on the big island. Fang thinks he has beaten the giant squid, but suddenly the squid attacks them again. Yaya lifts the boat, finding no squid hidden beneath them. Kurita swims towards them. Papa Zola throws Gopal towards the squid so he can change it to food, in which Gopal does so.

They continue their journey by walking in the forest of the island, with Papa Zola eating the fried squid. They camp in the jungle for the night. Meanwhile, Yoyo Oo monitors Ochobot's movements. Klamkabot - the Power Sphere who has been the target of the aliens - emerges from nowhere and attacks Ochobot, losing the latter's transmission. Consequently, Bora Ra commands Yoyo Oo to release a creature dubbed 'J-Rex'. Back at the camp, BoBoiBoy wakes up to Ochobot's cry. He and his friends decide to continue on their journey without Papa Zola, Adu Du, and Probe.

After jumping to and entering a cave, Ying finally finds Ochobot, who is seen being 'controlled' by Klamkabot. BoBoiBoy hastily attacks Klamkabot, suspecting him as one of the Tengkotak Gang members until Ochobot stops him. They end up listening to Klamkabot's story about himself and the alien race of Ata Ta Tiga. While they attentively do so, Bora Ra finds them and attacks them. The kids run away with Klamkabot's help. Meanwhile, at the camp, Papa Zola realises that he is left alone. He spots Adu Du and Probe from afar. Papa Zola chases Adu Du and questions him. Adu Du lies to him, claiming that the Tengkotak gang has kidnapped BoBoiBoy and his friends. Back at the cave, Klamkabot brings BoBoiBoy and his friends to the Power Sphere Lab, where the Spheres are created. However, Bora Ra and Gaga Naz follow them too and attack them again. After they fight Bora Ra and Gaga Naz, Klamkabot throws them onto the moving platform. Gaga Naz attacks them, destroying the platform. He presumes the kids to be dead and his work done. After Bora Ra captures Klamkabot, they return to their spaceship. Unbeknownst to them, BoBoiBoy and his friends were hidden below the platform.

Adu Du and Probe fool Papa Zola to feel the ground for the kids' fresh footsteps. Papa Zola becomes furious from this trick and demands them where BoBoiBoy's gang are heading. They all get a surprise attack from J-Rex, revealed as a giant shark with legs, and flee to safety from the creature. On the way, they find a hill to descend and slide on it.  At the end of the hill, Papa Zola, Adu Du and Probe held on the edge to avoid them from falling. J-Rex too slides down the hill but is on the verge to fall, but Papa Zola gives his hand to it. J-Rex, in debt to the rescue, decides to join Papa Zola's side. It also threatens Adu Du and Probe with the fall if they do not want to join him too. They go to the Tengkotak's spaceship and try to intrude it. With the help of J-Rex, they managed to impose it but end up captured by Gaga Naz and Kiki Ta.

BoBoiBoy's team arrive in front of the door of Power Sphere Lab, presuming it to be the dead end. After some investigation, however, the door opens on its own. They go into the lab and are greeted by the lab's computer. The computer lab orders Ochobot to upgrade. Meanwhile, Klamkabot is tortured by the Tengkotak Gang nearby.  After being upgraded, Ochobot has a new appearance. Suddenly, the computer tells them that teleportation power is ready to be used.  Bora Ra and Yoyo Oo are surprised at the knowledge that Klamkabot's absence of the teleportation power. Ochobot tells them his real mission: to run away with the power by teleporting to a place far away from the Tengkotak Gang, ensuring the power to be safe. BoBoiBoy becomes sad and asks if there is another way. The computer commands Ochobot to teleport. However, Boboiboy stops them. After a while, Yoyo Oo contacts BoBoiBoy. Bora Ra is angry and demands to give Ochobot along with Papa Zola, Adu Du, and Probe as his hostages. Boboiboy reluctantly gives Ochobot to the Tengkotak Gang. BoBoiBoy teleports to the Tengkotak Gang and gives Ochobot to them.
 
But Bora Ra does not take well on that and soon destroys Ochobot, gaining the teleportation power, but before he dies he gives BoBoiBoy and his friend's new powers. This enables BoBoiBoy to upgrade two of his abilities, Fire and Water, into Blaze and Ice and is able to defeat Bora Ra with the help of his friends. Meanwhile, Papa Zola, Adu Du and Probe are captured by Yoyo Oo and Kiki Ta, but before Kiki Ta can shoot them, J-Rex escapes and intimidates Kiki Ta, but Adu Du breaks free and defends her, finally winning Kiki Ta's love, but when Adu Du asks for her help after his hand gets bit by J-Rex, Kiki Ta loses that affection. Meanwhile, Bora Ra attempts to use the teleportation power, only to discover Adu Du tricked Yoyo Oo into giving him the fake teleportation coordinates. Ultimately, BoBoiBoy is able to trap Bora Ra into his own black hole, and as he and his friends mourn Ochobot, Klamkabot uses his remaining strength to give Ochobot the teleportation power, reviving Ochobot.

BoBoiBoy, Papa Zola and the others take a selfie together but are startled by J-Rex. Papa Zola introduces it to BoboiBoy and his friends. Then, Cici Ko reveals himself to be the one foiling the Tengkotak Gang's plans, having them hostage. He bids farewell to BoBoiBoy and his friends and leaves.

The end credits show BoBoiBoy, Gopal, Yaya, Ying, Ochobot, Papa Zola, Adu Du, Probe and J-Rex as they return to Rintis Island, along with Cici Ko having the Tengkotak locked up.

Cast

English dub

Production 
The film was originally titled BoBoiBoy: Power Sphere during production. Nizam Razak stated that this movie cost RM5 million, and he described it as the 'significant value'. The production for the film takes two years time with a staff of 70 animators.  The process of inserting actor voice was started since the movie started its production until it finished at the end of 2015. This film also received funding from National Film Development Corporation Malaysia (FINAS), Multimedia Development Corporation (MDeC), and Malaysia Animation Creative Content Centre (MAC3). The original duration of the movie is 160 minutes, but it has been shortened to 100 minutes after several scenes were cut to fulfil the standard for a children's movie. He also stated that this film will include more action and comedy than the TV series.

Music

Soundtrack 

The movie has two original soundtracks, which are "Masih Di Sini" by Bunkface and "Di Bawah Langit Yang Sama" by D'Masiv. The former is used in trailers and mostly in battle scenes, while the latter is used for the movie's closing credits.

Di Bawah Langit Yang Sama was first released to the public on iTunes on 22 January 2016 while its music video in Monsta Studio's YouTube channel on 5 February 2016.  Masih Di Sini's music video was released on 2 March 2016, one day before the movie's release in Malaysia, while its iTunes release came five days later.

Release 
Animonsta Studios announced in June 2013 that the project Power Sphere that was expected for release in 2014. The project announced featured official artwork of Klamkabot and BoBoiBoy.  The project was later delayed to the end of 2015, where Animonsta Studios released the movie's official teaser on YouTube in February 2015.  Seven months later, Animonsta Studios released the official trailer for the movie on their official YouTube channel.

On 21 December 2015, Animonsta Studios officially announced the release date for Malaysian cinemas to be 3 March 2016 in their official Facebook account, whereas the Indonesian release date was announced to be on 13 April 2016 nine days later. In February 2016, Animonsta Studios released their second official trailer on YouTube.

Animonsta Studios plans to promote this movie in the 2016 Tokyo Anime Award Festival in March 2016. There are discussions on bringing the movie to Kazakhstan, and there are also some plans to bring the film to nearby countries such as Thailand, the Philippines, Vietnam, and Cambodia where there are audiences expressing interest in this film. The movie was shown in 115 cinemas in Malaysia, 100 in Indonesia, two in Brunei, and two in Singapore.  For the Indonesian market, the movie was screened in CGV Blitz, Cinemaxx, and Platinum.

After the success in Malaysia and Indonesia, BoBoiBoy: The Movie is set to be shown in South Korean cinemas on 100 screens across the country in the first quarter of 2017.  The movie started showing in South Korean cinemas on 1 March 2017 in over 100 cinemas in South Korea including Lotte, CGV and Megabox.

An English dub of the movie premiered on Disney Channel Asia on 21 August 2016.

It aired in India on 27 May 2018 on Hungama TV in Hindi, Tamil and Telugu.

Home media 
The film was released on DVD to the Malaysian market on 28 May 2016 by Rusa Music and Animonsta Studios.

For the Indonesian market, Animonsta Studios has collaborated with KFC Indonesia to sell the official DVD throughout Indonesia.  The fourth episode of BoBoiBoy Galaxy was exclusively included in the Indonesian DVD.

Online streaming 
On 9 December 2018, Animonsta announced on their official Facebook page that the entire full-length movie is available for streaming on the company's YouTube channel. The movie is also available on Netflix.

Reception 

Animonsta Studios targeted RM25 million (US$6 million) for this movie, with RM12-13 million (US$3–3.2 million) target for Malaysia and Brunei markets, and RM12-13 million (US$4–4.24 million) target for Indonesian market.After four days, the movie earned a very high value which is RM 3.5 million.  After 11 days, this movie has made its name as the highest-grossing Malaysia animated movie, beating Geng: The Adventure Begins which grossed RM6.3 million, before being overtaken by Upin & Ipin: Keris Siamang Tunggal in 2019.  The movie achieved their target after 17 days in Malaysia as they have collected RM13 million, exceeding their target for the Malaysian market. The movie was shown in Malaysian cinemas for 56 days. This movie received very positive reviews from audiences and critics alike.

For the Indonesian market, the movie managed to earn more than 5 billion rupiahs (RM 1.48 million) after 12 days.

Awards 
Festival Filem Malaysia 28

References

External links 
 BoBoiBoy: The Movie Official Website
 BoBoiBoy: The Movie Official Teaser
 BoBoiBoy: The Movie Official Trailer #1
 BoBoiBoy: The Movie Official Trailer #2
 The Making of BoBoiBoy: The Movie
BoBoiBoy Movie 2 Poster Reveal Video

2016 films
2016 3D films
Malay-language films
2010s superhero films
Malaysian animated films
2016 computer-animated films
Animonsta Studios
Films directed by Nizam Razak